This article is about events in the year 2023 in Madagascar

Incumbents 
 President: Andry Rajoelina
 Prime Minister: Christian Ntsay

Events 
Ongoing – COVID-19 pandemic in Madagascar; 2021–2022 Madagascar famine;

 16 January – 1 February – Cyclone Cheneso kills at least 33 people.
 12 March – At least 22 people are killed and two others are reported missing after a boat heading to Mayotte capsizes off the coast of Madagascar.
Scheduled
 2023 Malagasy presidential election

See also 

COVID-19 pandemic in Africa
2022–23 South-West Indian Ocean cyclone season
International Organization of Francophone countries (OIF)

References 

 
Madagascar
Madagascar
2020s in Madagascar
Years of the 21st century in Madagascar